Weekender is a 2011 British drama film directed by Karl Golden and starring Jack O'Connell, Henry Lloyd-Hughes, Ben Batt and  Emily Barclay. It was written by Chris Coghill.

Plot
1990: The rave scene has arrived from Ibiza and warehouse parties are exploding across the United Kingdom, bringing phenomenal wealth to the organisers. In Manchester, best mates Matt and Dylan are in their early twenties and long to be more than just punters. As the government moves to outlaw the scene, it's now or never and they quickly rise through the ranks to join the promoting elite. They are taken on a wild journey from the exclusive VIP rooms of London clubs to the outrageous parties in Ibiza super-villas and the hedonism of Amsterdam. It's everything they dreamed of and more. But as their success continues to grow, they attract a more dark and sinister world. Matt and Dylan start to drift apart as they are forced to question the dreams they set out to achieve and their once solid friendship.

Cast
 Jack O'Connell as Dylan
 Henry Lloyd-Hughes as Matt
 Ben Batt as John Anderson
 Emily Barclay as Claire
 Tom Meeten as Captain Acid/Mickey Muddle
 Stephen Wight as Gary Mac
 Zawe Ashton as Sarah
 Dean Andrews as Sargent Thompson
 Craig Izzard as Harry
 Sam Hazeldine as Maurice
 Richard Riddell as Craig
 Perry Fitzpatrick as Chris

Reception
Weekender received generally negative reviews, currently holding a 9% rating on review aggregator website Rotten Tomatoes based on 11 reviews. On Metacritic, based on five critics, the film has a 35/100 rating, signifying "generally unfavorable reviews".

References

External links
 
 
 

2011 films
2011 drama films
British independent films
British drama films
Films set in Amsterdam
Films shot in Amsterdam
2011 independent films
2010s English-language films
2010s British films